Carrine Common & Penwethers is a Site of Special Scientific Interest (SSSI) in Cornwall, England, UK, noted for its biological characteristics. The  site is located at the settlement of Penweathers, within the civil parish of Kea, half a mile south of the city of Truro.

'Carrine Common' is also designated a Special Area of Conservation.

References

Sites of Special Scientific Interest in Cornwall
Sites of Special Scientific Interest notified in 1973
Special Areas of Conservation in Cornwall